2010 Trofeo Cassa di Risparmio may refer to two ATP tennis tournament, both sponsored by Italian saving banks from Alessandria and Ascoli Piceno respectively:
 2010 Alessandria Challenger (2009 Trofeo Cassa di Risparmio di Alessandria)
 2010 San Benedetto Tennis Cup (2010 Carisap Tennis Cup)

See also
 Cassa di Risparmio (disambiguation)